The 2016–17 Scottish League Two (known as Ladbrokes League Two for sponsorship reasons) was the 22nd season in the current format of 10 teams in the fourth-tier of Scottish football. The last placed team (Cowdenbeath) entered a play-off with a team nominated by the Scottish Football Association from outside the SPFL (East Kilbride), to determine which team entered League Two in the 2017–18 season. The fixtures were published on 17 June 2016.

Ten teams contested the league: Annan Athletic, Arbroath, Berwick Rangers, Clyde, Cowdenbeath, Edinburgh City, Elgin City, Forfar Athletic, Montrose and Stirling Albion. Arbroath won the league and were promoted, while Forfar were also promoted via the League One play-offs.

Teams
The following teams changed division since the 2015–16 season.

To League Two

Promoted from Lowland Football League
 Edinburgh City

Relegated from Scottish League One
 Forfar Athletic
 Cowdenbeath

From League Two

Relegated to Lowland Football League
 East Stirlingshire

Promoted to Scottish League One
 East Fife
 Queen's Park

Stadia and locations

Personnel and kits

Managerial changes

League summary

League table

Positions by round

Results
Teams play each other four times, twice in the first half of the season (home and away) and twice in the second half of the season (home and away), making a total of 36 games.

First half of season

Second half of season

Season statistics

Scoring

Top scorers

Hat-tricks

Discipline

Player

Yellow cards

Red cards

Club

Yellow cards

Red cards

Attendances

Awards

Monthly awards

Annual awards

League Two Manager of the Season
The League Two Manager of the Season was awarded to Dick Campbell.

League Two Player of the Season
The League Two Player of the Season was awarded to Shane Sutherland.

PFA Scotland Scottish League Two Team of the Year
The PFA Scotland Scottish Championship Team of the Year was:
Goalkeeper: Chris Smith (Stirling Albion)
Defence: Ricky Little (Arbroath), Thomas O'Brien (Forfar Athletic), Colin Hamilton  (Arbroath), Archie MacPhee (Elgin City)
Midfield: Brian Cameron (Elgin City), Thomas Reilly (Elgin City), Bobby Linn (Arbroath)
Attack: Steven Doris (Arbroath),  Shane Sutherland (Elgin City), Peter MacDonald (footballer) (Clyde)

League Two play-offs
The semi-final was contested between the winners of the 2016–17 Highland Football League (Buckie Thistle) and the 2016–17 Lowland Football League (East Kilbride). The winners then played off against the bottom club in League Two (Cowdenbeath).

Semi-finals

First leg

Second leg

Final

First leg

Second leg

References

Scottish League Two seasons
4
4
Scot